Howard Louis Carr Jr. (born January 17, 1952) is an American conservative radio talk-show host, political author, news reporter and award-winning writer.

He hosts The Howie Carr Show originating from his studios in Wellesley, MA and broadcast on weekdays on WRKO in Boston as well as to an audience based in New England, in addition to writing three columns a week for the Boston Herald.

Career

Journalism 
Carr began his career as a reporter for the Winston-Salem Journal, before returning to New England in 1979 as assistant city editor for the Boston Herald American (now the Boston Herald). From 1980 to 1981, he was the Boston City Hall bureau chief of the Herald American, and he later worked as the paper's State House bureau chief. As a political reporter for WNEV (now WHDH) in 1982, his coverage of then-mayor Kevin White was so relentless that after the mayor announced he was not running again, he told The Boston Globe that one of the things he enjoyed most about his impending retirement was not having Carr chase him around the city.

For years Carr has criticized former Boston Globe and Herald guest columnist Mike Barnicle. In 1998, Barnicle resigned from the Boston Globe over allegations of plagiarism and fabrication of stories. A Boston Globe column by Steve Bailey stated that Carr gave out Barnicle's home phone number, an allegation Carr denies. Barnicle called Carr "a pathetic figure", and asked "Can you imagine being as consumed with envy and jealousy toward me for as long as it has consumed him?"

In 1998, Don Imus claimed Carr's wife was having an affair with boxer Riddick Bowe. Mrs. Carr retained Alan Dershowitz as her lawyer. The parties reached an undisclosed settlement. In a 2007 column, Carr alleged that Imus' statements were incited by Barnicle. According to Carr, Barnicle told Imus that Carr had said Imus "would die before his kid got out of high school".

In 2002, the Boston Herald and Carr were the subjects of a lawsuit by Superior Court Judge Ernest Murphy. The newspaper reported that Murphy had said of a fourteen-year-old rape victim: "She can't go through life as a victim. She's 14. She got raped. Tell her to get over it." He was also alleged to have said of a 79-year-old robbery victim: "I don't care if she's 109." Carr, in a front-page column on February 20, 2002, criticized Murphy for handing down lenient sentences in bail decisions in rape cases and included references to his daughters, wondering what Murphy would do if it was one of his offspring that had been the victim. Murphy denied all of the allegations and claimed the newspaper libeled him, ruining his physical and emotional health and damaging his career and reputation as a good man. Ultimately, Murphy won the suit and was awarded a $2.09 million payment. During the trial, when asked what his reaction was to the Carr column, Murphy had said he "wanted to kill him".

Broadcasting

Carr has hosted local Boston weekday radio talk-shows since the 1980s on WRKO (AM 680). The Howie Carr Show has since become syndicated on more than twenty-five radio stations throughout northern and central New England, and can be heard elsewhere via live streaming on HowieCarrShow.com. In November 2014, Carr left syndicator Entercom Communications and formed his own Howie Carr Radio Network. 
WRKO had announced it would not carry the show but on March 9, 2015 it became an affiliate as of March 16, 2015.

In September 2016, the pay television channel Newsmax TV began simulcasting The Howie Carr Show.

Carr has filled in for several nationally syndicated talk show hosts, including Mark Levin and Dennis Miller.

He has also worked as a reporter and commentator for Boston television stations WGBH-TV and WLVI.

Literature
Carr has written non-fiction books about Boston gangsters, and the Kennedy family; and also two novels.

Non-fiction

Winter Hill Gang series
In early 2006, Carr became a book author with the publication of the New York Times-rated best-seller The Brothers Bulger, about brothers Billy and Whitey Bulger. Whitey was the third boss of the Winter Hill Gang. Carr's second book, Hitman, was released in April 2011, two months before Whitey Bulger (then under the name Charlie Gasko) was arrested after sixteen years on the run. About Johnny Martorano, Hitman was also rated a best-seller by The New York Times. In 2013, Rifleman: The Untold Story of Stevie Flemmi was published. It was followed a year later by Ratman: The Trial and Conviction of Whitey Bulger.

Billy Bulger's power as President of the Massachusetts Senate intrigued Carr. He began to research both the politician and his gangster brother. Indeed, Carr's arrival on Madison Street in Somerville, Massachusetts, in the late 1970s meant he was perfectly placed to do just that, for Somerville's Marshall Motors garage (at 12 Marshall Street; now a church) was an early base of the Winter Hill Gang. In 1978, the second leader of the Winter Hill Gang, Howie Winter, who lived one street away from Carr, on Montrose Street, was jailed on federal "horse race fixing" charges. Bulger succeeded him, and remained the boss until 1995, the year after he fled Boston due to a pending federal indictment. Whitey was on the FBI's Ten Most Wanted list from 1999 until his arrest in Santa Monica, California, on June 22, 2011. He had a $2 million bounty on his head. Kevin Weeks replaced Bulger but was arrested and imprisoned in 2000. He was released in 2005 after having served as a cooperating witness for the FBI.

While Carr believes Whitey Bulger wanted him dead ("his greatest regret is not killing me"), due to his finger-pointing at Billy Bulger, he disputes Kevin Weeks' claim that they were close to killing him by either blowing him up with explosives placed inside a basketball, or by shooting him from a cemetery across the street from Carr's former home at 91 Concord Road in Acton, Massachusetts. Whitey and Weeks had knowledge of Carr's residence because Carr was a neighbor of one of Weeks' brothers.

Whitey knew what Carr looked like, from Carr's job on television. "Plus, I was in his neighborhood every day. But I never ventured into Whitey's package store." The store in question was South Boston Liquor Mart (also known as Stippos; now Rotary Liquors), at 295 Old Colony Avenue, which Whitey had extorted from its legitimate owner.

Carr began taking whatever precautions he could to keep Whitey and Weeks off his tail. "The key to staying alive, I quickly figured out, was to avoid becoming a creature of habit. Wiseguys (or anyone else) who don't mix up their routines are the ones who inevitably get caught 'flat-footed,' to use the old expression. I drove home a different way every evening. If possible, when I parked, I backed into the space so that, if I had to, I could flee more quickly. I stopped meeting face-to-face with anyone I didn't know. I stayed out of bars, especially in Southie. Occasionally I'd sleep somewhere other than my house. The local cops kept an eye on my house in the pre-dawn hours. Slowly the noose began to tighten around Whitey's neck and I relaxed somewhat. Whitey vanished in late 1994, but Weeks was still lurking about. At a tanning salon, he bragged to a Herald photographer that he knew that I had lived next to a graveyard. He mentioned nothing about any C-4 or high-powered rifles, but when he was arrested in 1999 his indirect threats against me were included in a DEA detention warrant." "I was always looking over my shoulder," Carr explained four years after Whitey's arrest. "The day he went missing, I was driving down the street, and on the radio, they said he had disappeared. For the first time in ten years, I didn't have to look over my shoulder."

Kennedy family
Carr's book Kennedy Babylon: A Century of Scandal and Depravity, Volume I, was released in 2015 and Volume II was released in 2018.

Fiction
In 2012, Carr moved into fictional writing with his third book, Hard Knocks, which was followed three years later by Killers, his sixth and most recent release.

Relationship with Donald Trump
During the Donald Trump 2016 presidential campaign, Carr hosted rallies and he had lunch with the candidate on his private jet. Carr had candidate Trump on his radio show more than a dozen times, including election night. In 2017, Carr and his wife Kathy joined as member of the Mar-a-Lago Club, a resort and hotel for dues-paying members.

On June 29, 2016, Carr, as an opening speaker at a Bangor, Maine, rally for Republican presidential candidate Donald Trump, made a Native American "war whoop" when referring to Democratic Senator Elizabeth Warren of Massachusetts.

Personal life

Carr was born in Portland, Maine, to Frances Stokes Sutton and Howard Louis Carr Sr. (1905–2008). His early childhood was split between Palm Beach, Florida, where his father worked at The Breakers Palm Beach and Greensboro, North Carolina, where his mother worked as a secretary to a local CEO.

After Carr's mother took a job as the assistant to the headmaster at Deerfield Academy, a boarding school in Deerfield, Massachusetts, Carr received a scholarship to the school. After four years at the school, Carr was accepted into Brown University, but could not attend due to a lack of funds, so he attended the University of North Carolina at Chapel Hill (UNC). At UNC, Carr was a member of Phi Beta Kappa and wrote at student newspaper The Daily Tar Heel and graduated in 1973.

Previously living in Somerville and Acton, Carr has lived in Wellesley, Massachusetts, since 1993 with his second wife, Kathy Stimpson (whom he refers to as his "mailroom manager"), a Wellesley realtor, and their three daughters. Carr also has two daughters from a previous marriage.

In March 2007, Carr had a melanoma removed from his forehead.

In 2009, Carr crashed his car into a telephone pole on Wellesley Avenue in Wellesley. He was not injured but was cited for a marked-lanes violation.

In November 2014, Carr was injured in another car crash, this time on the Massachusetts Turnpike. He was taken to hospital after the accident, which occurred around 1:00 pm, but was released that evening.

Carr owns houses in Wellesley, MA., Cape Cod, and Palm Beach, FL.

Awards and recognition
 In 2022, Carr was ranked the 17th most important talk show host in the United States according to Talkers Magazine.
 In 2017, Carr was ranked the 14th most important talk show host in America by Talkers Magazine.
 Carr was ranked 14th on the Heavy Hundred 2016 list and 15th on the Heavy Hundred 2015 list. The list ranks talk-show hosts from around the U.S. whom this trade journal considers the most popular, influential, or entertaining.  Carr has been on this list since 2007, falling to 56th in 2009.
 Placed 57th on Talkers Magazines list of the 2014 "Heavy Hundred".
 Was inducted into the National Radio Hall of Fame in 2008.
 In 1985, Carr won the National Magazine Award for Essays and Criticism. 
 In television, he has been nominated for an Emmy Award.

Bibliography

Non-fiction
 The Brothers Bulger: How They Terrorized and Corrupted Boston for a Quarter Century, New York: Warner Books, 2006, 
 Hitman: The Untold Story of Johnny Martorano: Whitey Bulger's Enforcer and the Most Feared Gangster in the Underworld, New York: Forge Books, 2011, 
 Rifleman: The Untold Story of Stevie Flemmi, Frandel, 2013, 
 Ratman: The Trial And Conviction of Whitey Bulger, Frandel, 2014, 
 Kennedy Babylon: A Century of Scandal and Depravity, Volume 1, Frandel, 2017, 
 What Really Happened: How Donald J. Trump Saved America From Hillary Clinton, Frandel, 2018, 

Fiction
 Hard Knocks, New York: Forge Books, 2012, 
 Killers, New York: Forge Books, 2015,

Filmography
 A Civil Action (1998): The film is based on the real-life case of Anderson v. Cryovac, Inc. that took place in Woburn, Massachusetts during the 1980s. Carr played a radio talk show host.

References

External links
 Howie Carr's official website
 Boston Herald's Howie Carr columns
 
 WRKO page of Howie Carr

1952 births
Living people
American essayists
American non-fiction crime writers
American talk radio hosts
Writers from Portland, Maine
People from Wellesley, Massachusetts
University of North Carolina at Chapel Hill alumni
Deerfield Academy alumni
American male journalists
Radio personalities from Boston
Writers from Boston
American male essayists
People from Acton, Massachusetts
21st-century American journalists
Newsmax TV people